The Shadow King may refer to:

 The Shadow King (novel), a 2019 novel by Maaza Mengiste
 The Shadow King (film), a 2011 film project by Henry Selick cancelled in 2012
 The Shadow King (play), an Australian play based on King Lear, performed in 2014 starring Jada Alberts